Lanercost Priory was founded by Robert de Vaux between 1165 and 1174, the most likely date being 1169, to house Augustinian canons. The priory is situated at the village of Lanercost, Cumbria, England, within sight of Naworth Castle, with which it had close connections.  The Lanercost Chronicle, a thirteenth-century history of England and the Wars of Scottish Independence, was compiled by the monks of the priory.

It is now open to the public and in the guardianship of English Heritage.

Early years
The foundation date was traditionally 1169, but can only be dated definitely between 1165 and 1174 on the evidence of charters. The dedication is to Mary Magdalene, unusual in the region.

It would seem the arrangements for founding the Priory were well advanced by the time of the foundation charter, as opposed to the more gradual process at Wetheral and St Bees priories. Robert de Vaux gave the land of Lanercost "between the ancient wall and the Irthing and between Burth and Poltros, the vill of Walton by stated bounds, the church of that vill with the chapel of 'Treverman,' the churches of Irthington, Brampton, Carlaton and Farlam". The charter of foundation states that the benefaction was made for the sake of Henry II, and for the health of the souls of his father Hubert and his mother Grace.

Soon after the foundation of the house, Robert de Vaux granted to the canons the right of free election, so that when the lord prior died the person on whom the choice of the canons or the greater part of them fell should be elected in his place.

The bulk of the church building dates from the late 13th century, though there is evidence of earlier work. The Priory buildings were constructed, at least in part, from stones derived from Hadrian's Wall, including a number of Roman inscriptions that were built into its fabric.

Visitors and raiders
The proximity to Scotland inevitably had an effect on the fortunes of the priory, and it was a target of Scots attacks in retaliation for English raids. This became acute after the outbreak of the Wars of Scottish Independence. In 1296 the Scottish army encamped at Lanercost after burning Hexham priory and Lambley nunnery. The Scots were interrupted before the damage could become great, and they retreated through Nicolforest, having burnt some houses of the monastery but not the church. Similar depredations under Wallace continued the next year and led to calls for reprisals from the English.

Edward I made several visits to the priory in the latter part of his reign. In the autumn of 1280 he visited in the company of Queen Eleanor on his way to Newcastle. The canons met him at the gate in their copes, and although staying only a few days, he found time to take 200 stags and hinds while hunting in Inglewood forest. In 1300, on his way to the siege of Caerlaverock Castle, Edward stayed at Lanercost for a short while.

Edward's last visit was in 1306, travelling in a horse litter owing to age and illness, and accompanied by Queen Margaret, his second wife. He arrived at Michaelmas and his stay extended until the following Easter, a duration of 6 months which put a huge burden upon the resources of the priory. It was while Edward was at Lanercost that the brothers of Robert de Brus and other Scottish captives were sent to Carlisle for execution by his order.

This last royal visit depleted the reserves of the priory, and the canons begged him for recompense, but a deal to acquire the church of 'Hautwyselle,' worth about 100 marks a year, fell through. However the king granted the appropriation of the churches of Mitford in Northumberland and Carlatton in Cumberland, for the relief of the Priory. In a letter to the Pope, Edward gave his reasons for generosity being the special devotion he felt to St Mary Magdalene, his long stay due to illness, and making good the damage of the Scots. Edward died shortly afterwards at Burgh by Sands in July 1307, whilst still campaigning against the Scots.

In August 1311, Robert Bruce, King of Scotland, came with his army and made it his headquarters for three days, "committing infinite evils" and imprisoning some canons, though later letting them free. By contrast in 1328, in fulfilment of the treaty between the Bruce and Edward III, a mutual interchange of good offices took place between the priory of Lanercost and Kelso Abbey in respect of their common revenues out of the church of Lazonby. 
Later though, in 1346, David II ransacked the conventual buildings and desecrated the church. Fresh from the overthrow of Liddel he "entered the holy place with haughtiness, threw out the vessels of the temple, stole the treasures, broke the doors, took the jewels, and destroyed everything they could lay hands on". As late as 1386, one of the priors was taken prisoner by the Scots and ransomed for a fixed sum of money and four score quarters of corn.

The fortunes of the priory were linked to the state of warfare and raids on the border. The priory was in relatively affluent circumstances before the outbreak of the war of Independence in 1296, and the annual revenue of the house was returned at £74 12s 6d in the 1291 valuation of Pope Nicholas IV. But by the taxation of 1318, the value had fallen almost to nothing.

The parish church
Lanercost Priory was dissolved in 1538 by Henry VIII, and the conventual buildings were stripped of their roofs, excepting the church building which continued in use as the parish church. In the late 17th century, as the nave deteriorated, the congregation used just the north aisle which had been re-roofed.  
 
In 1747, the nave was re-roofed, but by 1847 the Priory was in a state of disrepair to the extent that the east end roof collapsed. However, by 1849, The church was in use again after a major restoration by Anthony Salvin. In the 1870s, there was further restoration by the Carlisle architect C. J. Ferguson.

At the Dissolution, ownership had passed to the Dacre family, and then in the early 18th century to the Howards. In 1929, the Priory ruins were put into public ownership, and today they are managed by English Heritage.

Architectural notes

The nave has an aisle to the north but a large wall to the south with no aisle, where it abuts the cloister. The impressive ruined chancel and crossing of ca. 1220–1230 are in a good state of preservation; as high as the eaves, and would only require a roof and windows to be restored to the original condition. The oldest masonry is in the south transept, and dates from the late 12th century. The cloister and monastic buildings have been largely dismantled, except for the west range, which was made into a house by Sir Thomas Dacre in the 16th century. 
The statue of St Mary Magdalene, given by King Edward I, still survives in a niche high up on the west front. A dossal – an embroidered wall hanging – designed by William Morris in 1881, underwent restoration before being replaced behind the priory altar in 2013–14.

Memorials
The priory has an unusual medieval stone carving called the Lanercost Cross with an inscription dating back to 1214. Originally the cross was set just
outside the entrance to the church. Today, the stump of the cross remains, but the main shaft is housed inside the priory.
In the churchyard is the tomb of Thomas Addison, scientist and physician. In the nave is a memorial to the Reverend Henry Whitehead, former vicar of Lanercost, best known for his pioneering epidemiological work with John Snow on cholera.

Humphrey Dacre, 1st Baron Dacre, and his widow Mabel were both buried at the Priory in the 15th century, as is Thomas Dacre, 2nd Baron Dacre.

Other burials
Ralph Dacre, 1st Baron Dacre
Hugh Dacre, 4th Baron Dacre
William Dacre, 5th Baron Dacre
Thomas Dacre, 6th Baron Dacre
Philippa de Neville
Thomas Dacre, 2nd Baron Dacre

See also

List of English abbeys, priories and friaries serving as parish churches
Grade I listed buildings in Cumbria
Grade I listed churches in Cumbria
Listed buildings in Burtholme

References

External links

Lanercost Priory official website
Lanercost Cross – medieval stone carving history, translation and photographs.
Lanercost website
 Visit Cumbria web page
The Cumbria Directory – Lanercost Priory
 Visitor information:English Heritage
 Teachers' resource pack: English Heritage

Church of England church buildings in Cumbria
English Heritage sites in Cumbria
Augustinian monasteries in England
Monasteries in Cumbria
Tourist attractions in Cumbria
1169 establishments in England
Religious organizations established in the 1160s
Grade I listed buildings in Cumbria
Christian monasteries established in the 12th century
1538 disestablishments in England
Monasteries dissolved under the English Reformation